Science of Love: A Modern Dating Experiment is an NBC reality dating special hosted by Mark Consuelos and starring NFL football player Adam Johnson. The show was produced by 3 Ball Productions and Joke Productions.  It premiered on Monday, June 25, 2007.

The one-hour TV special explored whether science could offer a method of achieving love, and pitted experimental methods against a more instinctual approach.

After choosing a woman he was initially attracted to, Adam was then presented with a date chosen by him for science.  After dating both, Adam had to choose whether or not he wanted to continue with the woman he originally chose, or the option presented to him by science.

On the special, the scientific match, Casey Dee, won Adam's heart. As a prize, the two were flown to Hawaii.

References

Television series by Universal Television
American dating and relationship reality television series
2000s American reality television series
2007 American television series debuts